The siege of Rouen (December 1591 – May 1592) was an unsuccessful attempt by Henry IV of France to capture Rouen, the historical capital city of Normandy. The battle took place as part of the French Wars of Religion, the Eighty Years' War, and the Anglo–Spanish War (1585–1604). Although he had claimed the throne in 1589, Henry, a Huguenot, was not recognized by many of his Catholic subjects, and he was forced to fight against a Catholic League determined to resist his rule, and which was aided by Spain.

At Rouen the combined French, English, and Dutch forces of Henry IV battled the troops of the Catholic League, commanded by André de Brancas, Amiral de Villars, and the Spanish forces led by Don Alexander Farnese, Duke of Parma. The city resisted until the arrival of the Spanish troops, which defeated and forced the Protestant forces to lift the siege.

See also
 Siege of Paris (1590)
 Battle of Craon
 War of the Three Henrys
 Eighty Years' War
 French Wars of Religion

Notes

References
 James, Alan. The Navy and Government in Early Modern France, 1572-1661. First published 2004. Woodbridge, Suffolk, UK. 
 Janel Mueller/Joshua Scodel. Elizabeth I: Translations, 1592-1598. The University of Chicago.

Conflicts in 1591
Conflicts in 1592
History of Catholicism in France
Battles of the French Wars of Religion
Military history of Normandy
Sieges involving France
Sieges involving Spain
Sieges involving England
Sieges involving the Dutch Republic
Siege
1591 in France
1592 in France